Jim the Penman is a 1915 silent film crime drama produced by the Famous Players Film Company and released through Paramount Pictures. It was the first movie based on a well-known stage play, Jim the Penman by Charles Lawrence Young, about a forger in Victorian Britain. The film was directed by Edwin S. Porter and starred stage actor John B. Mason, in his debut film, in line with Adolph Zukor's efforts to recruit famous stage actors for films. Co-starring with Mason was the young up-and-coming favorite Harold Lockwood. Mason had played the part on the stage in the 1910 season on Broadway.

Some sources erroneously credit this film as being shot in a stereoscopic format, but it was in fact shot in the conventional 2D format. Stereoscopic tests films were shot by Porter (not for use in the film) using the sets and actors.  This film is lost.

Plot
Louis Percival (Harold Lockwood) uses his forgery talent to woo Nina (Marguerite Leslie).  He saves her father from bankruptcy by forging a check, but gets caught.  Percival is then blackmailed to use his forgery skills to help the shady character who caught him.

Cast
Harold Lockwood - Louis Percival
John B. Mason - James Ralston
Russell Bassett - Baron Hartfield
Frederick Perry - Captain Redwood
William Roselle - Lord Drelincourt
Marguerite Leslie - Nina L'Estrange

See also
Jim the Penman (1921 film)
List of lost films

References

External links

Jim the Penman at SilentEra

1915 films
1915 crime drama films
American crime drama films
American silent feature films
American films based on plays
Films directed by Edwin S. Porter
Films set in England
Films set in London
Lost American films
Paramount Pictures films
American black-and-white films
1915 lost films
Lost drama films
1915 crime films
1910s American films
Silent American drama films